Collett is both an English surname and a given name. Notable people with the name include:

 Collett (Norwegian family), including
 Axel Collett (1880–1968), Norwegian landowner
 Camilla Collett (1813–1895), Norwegian author
 James Collett (1655–1727), English-Norwegian merchant; origin of the Norwegian Collett family
 Johan Collett (1775–1827), Norwegian politician
 Johan Christian Collett (1817–1895), Norwegian politician, son of Johan Collett
 Jonas Collett (1772–1851), Norwegian politician
 Robert Collett (1842–1913), Norwegian zoologist

Other people with Collett as a surname:
 Andy Collett (born 1973), English retired football goalkeeper
 Anthony Collett (1877–1929), English author
 Arthur Henry Collett (1870-1930), an Australian politician who served as the Mayor of Parramatta 
 Ben Collett (born 1984), English footballer
 Charles Collett (1851–1952), British chief mechanical engineer of the Great Western Railway
 Charles E. Collett, American lawyer and 1924 Olympic water polo team member
 Elmer Collett (born 1944), American football player
 Ernie Collett (disambiguation), several people
 Gilbert Collett (1879–1945), English rugby union player
 Glenna Collett-Vare (1903–1989), American golfing champion
 Sir Henry Collett (1836–1901), army officer in the East India Company and botanist
 Herbert Collett (1877–1947), Australian politician and soldier
 Jason Collett, Canadian musician
 John Collett (artist) (1725–1780), English painter
 Joseph Collett (1673–1725), British East India Company administrator, Governor of Bencoolen and President of Madras
Laura Collett (born 1989), British equestrian who competes in eventing
 Lorraine Collett (1892–1983), American model, the "Sun-Maid girl"
 Lucy Collett (born 1989), British glamour model 
 Mark Collett (born 1980), British political activist
 Nathan Collett, Kenyan filmmaker
 Ritter Collett (1921–2001), American sports editor and columnist
 Susan Collett (born 1961), Canadian artist
 Toni Collett (born 1972), birth name of Australian actress Toni Collette
 Wayne Collett (1945–2010), American Olympic silver medalist in the 400 meters

Given name:
 Collett Leventhorpe (1815–1889), Confederate brigadier general in the American Civil War
 Collett E. Woolman (1889–1966), one of the four founders of Delta Air Lines

English-language surnames
Patronymic surnames
Surnames from given names